Anna Serner, born 11 October 1964 in Stockholm, is a Swedish legal professional, public speaker and former CEO of the Swedish Film Institute.

Biography 
Born in 1964, Anna Serner is the CEO of the Swedish Film Institute. She took up the post on October 1, 2011.
Her previous position was as Managing Director of the Swedish Media Publishers' Association (Tidningsutgivarna), where she was active in public debate on freedom of speech and the media's role in society. For two years prior to this she ran her own marketing communications consultancy business, and was also CEO of the Advertising Association of Sweden (Reklamförbundet) from 1998 to 2006. With a degree in law, Anna has a wide experience of board level appointments, including Stockholm University of the Arts, Polarbröd, Berghs School of Communication, Folkoperan, Fanzingo and the Anna Lindh Academy She has also served as an expert on various Swedish government commissions, including one on copyright (2010). In addition, she undertook a two-year course in practical filmmaking at the Stockholm School of Film as well as film studies at Stockholm University.

Over the past 20 years Anna has also given lectures and spoken widely on law, advertising, creativity and management.

In October 2011 she succeeded Cissi Elwin as CEO of the Swedish Film Institute.

29 juni 2018 Serner hosted the popular Sveriges Radio radio show Sommar i P1.

Swedish Film Institute 
Serner's tenure as CEO of the Swedish Film Institute (SFI) have been marked by her notable work for gender equality in the film industry. An outspoken feminist, Serner is a frequent keynote speaker and panelist on this topic. 

In 2016 Anna Serner presented the initiative 5050x2020 at the Cannes Film Festival, aiming to raise international awareness regarding the issue of gender equality in film production, based on Sweden's prominent position. The year after, SFI and WIFT Nordic presented "50/50 by 2020 – Global Reach", a seminar at the Cannes Film Market focusing on how the work on equality is proceeding outside of Sweden. 

In 2018, with support from the Cannes Film Festival, the Swedish Film Institute arranged "Take Two: Next moves for #MeToo". Together with the then Swedish Minister for Culture and Democracy Alice Bah Kuhnke and the French Minister of Culture Françoise Nyssen, Anna Serner hosted an event concerning the work against sexual harassment and the misuse of power against women, with focus on the film industry. With a total of five Ministers of Culture from different countries attending, the event marked a shift at an international level for equality in the film industry. The same year, in co-operation with the Berlin International Film Festival, the seminar "Closing the Gap" was arranged. Anna Serner sat on a panel with representatives from WIFT Germany and WIFT Nordic to discuss how quality will be ensured through rewarding equality and diversity at the financing stage.

On April 23, 2021, Anna Serner announced that she would be stepping down in October 2021. After ten years of serving as CEO of the Swedish Film Institute, she is the Swedish film Institute's second longest serving CEO. Only the institute´s founder Harry Schein served as CEO for longer (1963-1970, 1972-1978). On November 12, 2021, Anette Novak was appointed Serner’s successor, with Mathias Rosengren (Head of the Film Heritage department at the Swedish Film Institute) serving as acting CEO during the interim period.

Family 
Anna Serner is the daughter of the legal professional Uncas Serner and dentist May Hoffmann-Serner.

References

External links
 Anna Serner's blogg
 Svenska Filminstitutet
 Anna Serner at Sommar i P1

Swedish feminists
Swedish mass media people
21st-century Swedish women
Swedish media executives
Swedish film people
Living people
1964 births
20th-century Swedish women